Frontier Ventures may refer to:

 the combined entity formed after joining the U.S. Center for World Mission  and Frontier Mission Fellowship
 venture capital fund founded by Dmitry Alimov

See also
 Frontier Adventure Sports & Training
 DFJ Frontier, an American venture capital firm